Paul Kipchumba, in Chinese Chen Pu (陈朴) (born 30 April 1983) is a Kenyan author, businessman and philanthropist from Elgeyo Marakwet County, Kenya. His other names are Kipwendui and Kibiwott. He speaks Chinese, English, Marakwet (his native language), and Swahili. He is listed as one of the best Kenya's writers of all time.

Education
He has studied literature and language at the University of Nairobi, Kenya, and Tianjin Foreign Studies University, China; Graduate Attachment at the British Institute in Eastern Africa under Henrietta More, a British professor of social anthropology at the University of Cambridge; Certificate in “Energy Within Environmental Constraints” at Harvard University (HavardX), USA, under David Keith, Gordon McKay professor of applied physics; has also sat for Chinese language proficiency test (HSK 6) at Hanban/ Confucius Institute.

Occupation
He is the Executive Chairman at Shenhai Energy (Shenhai Solar & Infomercial Researchers), and an advisor at Kipchumba Foundation.

Works
He has been writing from a young age, as exemplified by his emerging third best in the 1999 British Council Essay Writing Competition for high school students for his essay "Crime is a Bridge to Success". He has many publications with Kipchumba Foundation that are also available at Amazon and is recognized by a dozen other authors. The following are some of his publications:

Books and Stories
“A Crack” and Other Stories  
Africa in China’s 21st Century: In Search of a Strategy   
An Alternative School of Thought for Africa: My Interactions with a Kenyan Diplomat B E Kipkorir, 2007-2012  
It’s up to You, Kayla: An Anthology of Love Poetry  
Japanese Hunters http://kipchumbafound.org/wp-content/uploads/2018/03/Japanese-Hunters.pdf
Lessons for Economies in Transition: The Case of Elgeyo Marakwet County (EMC), Kenya  
Living a Sustainable Vision: My Cardinal Principles, 2010-2049, Volume II (b) (2018-2019): 2015-2019 (Global Enforcement and Accumulation of Capital)  
Living a Sustainable Vision: My Cardinal Principles, 2010-2049, Volume II (a) (2015-2017): 2015-2019 (Global Enforcement and Accumulation of Capital)  
Living a Sustainable Vision: My Cardinal Principles, 2010-2049, Volume I: 2010-2014 (Business Experimentation and Consolidation)  
“Mind Your Business” and Other Poems  
Oral Literature of the Marakwet of Kenya  
The EMC Agenda: Sampled Questions and Answers co-editor  
The Mysterious Business  
Turning Point in My Life

Papers and Abstracts
(2008). Choices for Harmonious Coexistence in African Oral Literature: Images of Conflict and Peace in Marakwet War Songs. http://kipchumbafound.org/wp-content/uploads/2018/03/Choices-for-Harmonious-Coexistence-in-African-Oral-Literature.pdf
(2009). Asian Oral Literature in Kenya's School Curricula. http://kipchumbafound.org/wp-content/uploads/2018/03/Asian-Oral-Literature-in-Kenyas-School-Curricula.pdf
(2012). Commercialization of African Storytelling: A Literary Perspective. http://kipchumbafound.org/wp-content/uploads/2018/03/Commercialization-of-African-Storytelling.pdf
(2013). Deception Motif in the Oral Narratives of the Sengwer of Embobut Forest, Kenya. http://kipchumbafound.org/wp-content/uploads/2018/03/Deception-Motif-in-the-Oral-Narratives-of-the-Sengwer-of-Embobut-Forest.pdf
(2014). A Cultural Window into East Africa. http://kipchumbafound.org/wp-content/uploads/2018/04/A-Cultural-Window-into-East-Africa.pdf
(2014). Conversations about China. http://kipchumbafound.org/wp-content/uploads/2018/04/Conversations-about-China.pdf
(2015). Who are Sirikwa? A Study on Clan Identity and Technological Ascription. [with D. Kimaiyo] Education Tomorrow – Kenya 1, 1 (September–December). ISSN 2523-1588 (Online), ISSN 2523-157X (Print).
(2015). Introduction. [with B. E. Kipkorir] Education Tomorrow – Kenya 1, 1 (September–December). ISSN 2523-1588 (Online), ISSN 2523-157X (Print).
(2016). Spiritual Characters and Characterization of Marakwet Oral Narratives with Respect to Religious Pillars in B. E. Kipkorir and F. Welbourn The Marakwet of Kenya: A Preliminary Study (2008). Education Tomorrow – Kenya 2, 1 (January–April). ISSN 2523-1588 (Online), ISSN 2523-157X (Print).
(2016). Introduction. Education Tomorrow – Kenya 2, 2 (May–August). ISSN 2523-1588 (Online), ISSN 2523-157X (Print).
(2016). Introduction.  Education Tomorrow – Kenya 2, 3 (September–December). ISSN 2523-1588 (Online), ISSN 2523-157X (Print).
(2016). Cushitic Groups. [with I. Lengutuk and F. Lekapana] Education Tomorrow – Kenya 2, 3 (September–December). ISSN 2523-1588 (Online), ISSN 2523-157X (Print). 
(2016). Policy Recommendations for Reducing CO2 Emissions in Kenya's Electricity Generation, 2015–2030. International Journal of Energy and Power Engineering 10, 10 (October). Abstract.
(2017). Petroleum Local Content Regulations and Ethnic Conflicts in Northern Kenya. Education Tomorrow – Kenya 3, 1 (January–April). ISSN 2523-1588 (Online), ISSN 2523-157X (Print).
(2018). A China-U.S. Trade War Will Harm Africa.
(2018). U.S. Smear Campaign Against China Will Fail.
(2018). A Critical Appraisal of African Union (AU) Agenda 2063. http://kipchumbafound.org/wp-content/uploads/2019/07/A-Critical-Appraisal-of-African-Union-Agenda-2063.pdf
(2019). Prof. Wanjala in Culture Work: A Reflection on Pokot and Marakwet Socio-Cultural Profiles. Education Tomorrow – Kenya 5, 1 (January–April). ISSN 2523-1588 (Online), ISSN 2523-157X (Print).
(2019). The Dangers of Cattle Rustling Terrorism in the Kerio Valley. http://emc-agenda.blogspot.com/2019/02/the-dangers-of-cattle-rustling.html
(2019). An Ode against Convenience Leaderships in Elgeyo Marakwet County (EMC). http://emc-agenda.blogspot.com/2019/02/an-ode-against-convenience-leaderships.html
(2019). The Essence of Personal Revolution. https://www.facebook.com/permalink.php?story_fbid=798050780571924&id=506633249713680&__tn__=K-R
(2020). The Concept of Emerging Technological Solutions as Vocational Skills: A Review. [With Xiao Qijia] http://kipchumbafound.org/wp-content/uploads/2020/04/The-Concept-of-Emerging-Technological-Solutions-as-Vocational-Skills-Xiao-Qijia-Paul-Kipchumba.pdf
(2021). Artificial Intelligence (AI), and Present and Future Employment Outlook. https://infomercialresearchers.blogspot.com/2021/02/artificial-intelligence-ai-and-present.html

Translations
(2016). Awen nyo Kuryonchotei: Nta Amunee to Kuweti Kuryong’otei Kimukulmet. Marakwet Translation of Ngugi wa Thiongio's “The Upright Revolution: Or Why Humans Walk Upright” (2012). Nairobi: Jalada.

Philanthropy
He is a major philanthropist in the realm of education. Most of his donations are channelled into Kipchumba Foundation, for which he is a major donor. He has also been instrumental in promoting peace and national cohesion in Kenya, especially in resolving communal conflicts between warring Marakwet and Pokot ethnic communities in North western Kenya, and in quelling political temperatures in 2017 in Kenya by convening stakeholder forums under the auspices of Kipchumba Foundation.

Human Rights Struggles
As an intern at the Kenya Human Rights Commission (2006-2007), Paul Kipchumba contributed much more in championing promotion of Human Rights among communities in Kenya. He founded the North Rift (region) Human Rights Networks and helped communities to document their Human Rights struggles in Mizizi ya Haki [The Roots of Justice] (community Human Rights newsletter) by enabling formation of community editorial boards, while serving as an overall coordinator and editor.

Controversy
In his book Africa in China’s 21st Century: In Search of a Strategy (2017), Paul Kipchumba says that democracy is not appropriate as a political system in Africa because it causes misery and can only be applicable in wealthy economies. He observes that there is need to advance a political system that accord with Africa's material and intellectual poverty. In this book he says that African countries should formulate policies on how to tap aid from China.

References

External links

1983 births
Living people
Kenyan business executives